Robert Lee Hess (December 18, 1932 – January 12, 1992) was an American scholar of African history, and the sixth President of Brooklyn College.

Personal life

Hess was born in Asbury Park, New Jersey, to Henry and Ada (Davis) Hess.  He attended Yale University, where he earned his B.A. (1954, magna cum laude), M.A. (1955), and Ph.D. (1960) degrees, studying African history.

He was a resident of Brooklyn. Hess was married to Frances H. Aaron in 1960, and had four children. Hess died January 12, 1992, in Mt. Sinai Medical Center in New York of lymphoma.

Academic career 
He taught from 1958 to 1961 at Carnegie Institute of Technology, from 1961–62 and 1963–64 at Mount Holyoke College, from 1962–63 at Boston University, and from 1961 to 1964 at Northwestern University.

From 1966 to 1979, Hess taught history at the University of Illinois at Chicago. In 1966, he was appointed an associate professor and promoted to full professor in 1971. At Chicago he served as Dean of Liberal Arts and Sciences, and, beginning in 1972 Associate Vice Chancellor for Academic Affairs.

Hess was the sixth president of Brooklyn College, from 1979 until 1992.  In a 1988 survey of thousands of academic deans, the college ranked 5th in the United States in providing students with a strong general education. Brooklyn College was the only college in the top five in the survey that was a public institution. While Brooklyn College was referred to as “the poor man’s Harvard,” Hess quipped: “I like to think of Harvard as the rich man’s Brooklyn College.”

The Robert L. Hess Scholar-in-Residence Program was established by Brooklyn College, and is supported by the Robert L. Hess Fund. I Scholars in residence have included Vartan Gregorian, James S. Langer, Daniel Miller, Robin D. G. Kelley, Agnieszka Holland, Marc Shell, Sean Wilentz, Thomas Frank, and Edwidge Danticat.

Hess wrote several books and many articles on 19th century Africa, the Horn of Africa, and colonialism. Among them were Ethiopia: the Modernization of Autocracy (considered by Choice: Current Reviews for Academic Libraries to be one of the ten best books on Africa), A bibliography of the primary sources for nineteenth century tropical African history, as recorded by explorers, missionaries, traders, travelers, administrators, military men, and adventurers (1965), Italian Colonialism in Somalia (1966), Patrick Gilkes, the Dying Lion: Feudalism and Modernization in Ethiopia (1977), and Ethiopia and the Horn of Africa (1978).

Honors 
He received both a Fulbright Fellowship (1956–1958 at the University of Rome in Italy) and a Guggenheim Fellowship (1968–69). He received  honorary degrees from: .

References 

1932 births
People from Asbury Park, New Jersey
1992 deaths
Yale College alumni
Presidents of Brooklyn College
20th-century American historians
American male non-fiction writers
20th-century American male writers
Mount Holyoke College faculty
Boston University faculty
Carnegie Mellon University faculty
Northwestern University faculty
American university and college faculty deans
University of Illinois Chicago faculty
Historians of Africa
Writers from Brooklyn
Historians from New York (state)
Historians from New Jersey
Yale Graduate School of Arts and Sciences alumni
Fulbright alumni